Casanova is a British television drama serial, written by television playwright Dennis Potter. Directed by Mark Cullingham and John Glenister, the serial was made by the BBC and screened on the BBC2 network in November and December 1971. It is loosely based on Italian adventurer Giacomo Casanova's Histoire de ma vie (Story of My Life; 1780–1792). It was Dennis Potter's first television serial, having previously written single plays for the BBC's The Wednesday Play and Play for Today series. Frank Finlay starred in the title role and was nominated for the best actor award at the 1972 BAFTA ceremony.

Plot

Episode one: "Steed in the Stable"
After being arrested and charged with "foul atheism" and fornication, Casanova is sentenced to five years imprisonment at "The Leads": the most notorious of Venetian gaols. Brutalised by Lorenzo the gaoler and devoid of hope under the harsh prison regime, Casanova's mind wanders back to his past loves and adventures. He finds himself haunted by the memory of Christina, a simple country girl he gave to another rather than marry her himself.

Episode two: "One at a Time"
Casanova receives a new cellmate in the form of Schalon, a corrupt insurance broker, and reflects on his seduction of three daughters at a house in Grenoble.

Episode three: "Magic Moments"
Casanova is irritated by his constantly complaining cell mate Schalon and remembers how he once pretended to be a magician casting a spell to seduce the virgin daughter of an old naive man.

Episode four: "Window, Window"
The episode flashes back and forward between Casanova trying to seduce Anne Roman-Coupier, even though his friend strongly discourages this, and him trying to receive some books while being in prison. He is also haunted by memories of watching a man being executed and him smashing a window with a stone in Venice.

Episode five: "Fevers of Love"
While in his prison cell, Casanova is tormented by fever dreams and flashbacks to his past loves and especially his stay in London.

Episode six: "Golden Apples"
This episode flashes back and forward between Casanova finally managing to escape from his prison cell and him trying to write his memoirs in Castle of Duchcov near the end of his life as an old, dying man.

Cast
Giacomo Casanova - Frank Finlay
Lorenzo - Norman Rossington
Christina - Zienia Merton
Barberina - Christine Noonan
Senator Bragadin - Geoffrey Wincott
Valenglart - David Swift
Dr Bellotti - Basil Clarke
Arlecchino - Tim Thomas
Anne Roman-Coupier - Ania Marson
Schalon - Patrick Newell
Genoveffa - Lyn Yeldham
Rose - Julia Cornelius
Manon - Brigid Erin Bates
Anna - Caroline Dowdeswell
Helena - Elaine Donnelly
Pantalone - Hugh Portnow
Circospetto - Christopher Hancock
Columbina - Rown Wylie
Nun - Gillian Brown
Feldkirchner - Graham Crowden
Dr Rasp - John Ringham
Father Balbi - Roger Hammond
Carlo - Igo Silic
Concertmaster - Oliver Butterworth
Pauline - Valerie Gearon

Production
In 1966, William R. Trask published the first of his 12 volume translation of Casanova's memoirs while Potter was working as a book reviewer for The Times newspaper. Potter had been after a subject for his first drama serial and found in Casanova a suitable figure to continue the themes of sex, memory and redemption that had influenced much of his previous work.

When writing the serial Potter decided not to read the story of Casanova's adventures, choosing instead to work from a list containing the names of Casanova's lovers and specific events from his life. Potter intended to explore the reason why Casanova was "driven" to have had so many sexual encounters. As a result, Potter's Casanova is far different from other interpretations of the character; he suffers from tristitia post-coitum (literally, the sadness after sex) and considers his reliance on women for sexual satisfaction a weakness. The serial includes a number of events that depart from established facts about Casanova.

The series resulted in a number of complaints to the BBC. Clean-up TV campaigner Mary Whitehouse, who regularly found fault with Potter's work, thought the first two episodes "boring" and believed the third used a kind of Playboy flashback photography. She commented to a journalist from The Glasgow Herald: "Of all the characters the BBC could have chosen to dramatise Casanova is the most ridiculous."

Home media
Casanova was released on DVD by BBC Worldwide in 2004, as part of The Dennis Potter Collection, a range of Potter's work released that year.

References

External links

1971 British television series debuts
1971 British television series endings
1970s British drama television series
BBC television dramas
Television series set in the 18th century
Films about Giacomo Casanova
Venice in fiction
Television shows written by Dennis Potter
1970s British television miniseries
English-language television shows